MARG Limited  (formerly known as MARG Constructions Ltd.), is an Indian construction company.

Timeline

 1994: Founded by G R K Reddy, a first generation entrepreneur.
 1995: May: MARG announced an IPO (Raised Rs. 12 million) and began trading on the Bombay Stock Exchange
 1996: Launched Sai Subhodaya Apartments in Chennai.
 1998: Completion of Wescare Towers in Chennai.
 2004: Completion of MARG's Digital Zone I, on the Chennai IT Corridor.
 2006: Obtained the Government of Puducherry's concession for the development of a modern port at Karaikal
 2006: Foreign Currency Convertible Bonds (FCCB) launched
 2006: MOU with Oakwood Asia Pacific for operation and management of serviced apartments.
 2006: Entered into a joint venture with Housing and Urban Development Corporation Ltd. (HUDCO) to form Signa Infrastructure India Limited.
 2007: March: Conceived the " Riverside Mall cum Business Hotel " project
 2007: May: Formal approval for MARG's SPV, New Chennai Township Private Limited (NCTPL)
 2007: June: Completion of MARG Square, on the Chennai IT Corridor.
 2007: July: Completion of Digital Zone II, on the IT Corridor.
 2007: August: Launched "Ramlakshmi Enclave" in Tenali, Andhra Pradesh
 2007: November: Launched Tapovan Villas
 2008: February: Launched MARG Swarnabhoomi – the 24 Carat Neo City with 2 notified Special Economic Zones
 2008: May: MARG to develop Fishing Harbour at Rajakkamangalam Thurai, near Kanyakumari.
 2008: August: MARG Chennai Marathon in aid of Give Life Charity
 2008: December: MARG awarded the contract for the development and operation of the Bijapur greenfield airport
 2008: December: MARG signs Consultancy Agreement with Surbana of Singapore for prefab construction technology for MARG Swarnabhoomi
 2009: January: Formal Approval for Port Based SEZ at Karaikal
 2009: January: MARG launches Pushpadruma an apartment project at Kalavakkam on the Old Mahabalipuram Road in Chennai.
 2009: February: MARG and Bala Vidya Mandir, Chennai sign MoU to set up a concept school at MARG Swarnabhoomi called BVM Global.
 2009: March: MARG launches Vishwashakti, an integrated township in the temple town of Tirupati, Andhra Pradesh
 2009: April: Inaugurated Karaikal Port 
 2009: April: Signed MoU with Chinmaya Heritage Centre for MARG Chennai Family Quiz 2009.
 2009: May: Swarnabhoomi Academy of Music Envisioned by Prasanna Launched
 2009: October: MARG Swarnabhoomi hosts a stop on AR Rahman's Jai Ho World Tour in aid of Shakti Foundation
 2009: October: MARG launches MARG Properties Brand for its real estate vertical
 2009: October: MARG ProperTies launches Utsav apartments at MARG Swarnabhoomi
 2009: November: Foundation stone laid for Utsav, Swarnabhoomi Academy of Music and Dhyaan Dham at MARG Swarnabhoomi by Sri Sri Ravi Shankar
 2010: January: Karaikal Port flags off its first railway cargo
 2010: February: MARG Puduvai Marathon in association with the Rotary Club of Pondicherry
 2010: March: MoU signed with Virginia Tech, USA to set up Virginia Tech MARG Swarnabhoomi campus
 2010: April: MARG launches Savithanjali apartments on OMR in Chennai
 2010: July: MARG launches Maha Utsav and Sky Meadows apartments at MARG Swarnabhoomi
 2010: July: Swarnabhoomi Academy of Music commences with its Six Month Diploma Program
 2010: Sep: Swarnabhoomi Academy of Music is officially inaugurated
 2010: Oct: IGBC (Indian Green Building Council) confirmed MARG Swarnabhoomi as the pilot project for platinum rated city in India
 2011: August: MARG Karaikal Port Launches Container Handling Services
 2011: August: Marg Institute of Design & Architecture, Swarnabhoomi launched at MARG Swarnabhoomi
 2011:November: Virgo Inaugurated at MARG Swarnabhoomi
 2011:December: Four Seasons, The affordable high rise apartment launched at MARG Swarnabhoomi
 2012: January: KPPL Railways dispatched the 2000s Coal Rake on 15.01.2013 at 14.30 Hrs.
 2012: April: MARG joins hand with Central Institute of Technology, Australia
 2012: April: MARG collected the prestigious "Golden Peacock Award for Corporate Social Responsibility"
 2012: April Marg Vishwashakthi Township Phase - I Handed over to customers total 192 Flats.
 2012: May: MARG Properties launches Pushkara, The Lake View Homes on OMR
 2012: May: MARG signs MoU with Malaysian-based Limkokwing University of Creative Technology
 2013: Feb: Bengal Feeder Line launches service between MARG Karaikal Port, Colombo, Hindu Business Line

Real Estate Residential 

MARG's residential spaces ranging from affordable homes to ultra luxury homes are covered under the aegis of 2 residential brands:

• MARG ProperTies

As of 2018, there have been several reported issues in the media related to MARG Properties. Many of these involve delays in handover of the MARG Brindavan project located near Oragadam area in Chennai. The project was launched with a great deal of sensationalism and with the slogan "Goodbye Landlady" and received a affirmative response with its media coverage. However, many of the buyers who had booked apartments with this project in late 2010 and in 2011 have reported no handover of these flats as of April 2018. This was also shot up with the arrest of the Chairman of MARG Group, G.R.K Reddy in November 2017 after a complaint was filed against him for cheating a buyer worth Rs. 25 lacs. The complainant had said that despite paying the money, MARG properties had not provided the apartment he has purchased.

Also in September 2017, MARG properties was one of the two builders penalized by Tamil Nadu Real Estate Regulatory Authority (TNRERA) for non-registration of projects before the deadline as proposed by the Authority.

References

External links
Official Website

Companies based in Chennai
Construction and civil engineering companies of India
Fastening tool manufacturers
Construction and civil engineering companies established in 1994
Indian companies established in 1994
1994 establishments in Tamil Nadu
Companies listed on the Bombay Stock Exchange